This is a list of animated television series first aired in 1990.

Anime television series first aired in 1990

See also
 List of animated feature films of 1990
 List of Japanese animation television series of 1990

References

Television series
Animated series
1990
1990
1990-related lists